Bertani is an Italian surname. Notable people with the surname include:

Agostino Bertani (1812–1886), Italian physician and revolutionary
Alex Bertani, Italian comic book editor
Bill Bertani (1919–1988), American soccer player
Corinne Bertani (born 1959), Monegasque politician
Cristian Bertani (born 1981), Italian footballer
Giovanni Battista Bertani (1516–1576), Italian painter and architect
Juan Miguel Bertani, Argentine coach
Matt Bertani (born 1976), American ice hockey coach
Orsini Bertani, Italian-Uruguayan editor
Pietro Bertani (1501–1558), Italian bishop and cardinal
Rogério Bertani, Brazilian arachnologist
Romeo Bertani (born 1999), Italian footballer

See also
Villa Mosconi Bertani, a Neoclassic villa in Verona

Italian-language surnames